Knotty Ash is a Liverpool City Council Ward in the Liverpool West Derby Parliamentary constituency. It was formed for the 2004 Municipal elections from the former Broadgreen ward taking small parts from Childwall, Croxteth and Dovecot.

Councillors
The ward has returned eleven councillors.

 indicates seat up for re-election after boundary changes.

 indicates seat up for re-election.

 indicates change in affiliation.

 indicates seat up for re-election after casual vacancy.

Election results

Elections of the 2010s 

In September 2012, Jacqui Nasuh resigned from the council. A by-election was held on 15 November 2012 (the same date as the elections for the first Police and Crime Commissioner).

Elections of the 2000s 

After the boundary change of 2004 the whole of Liverpool City Council faced election. Three Councillors were returned.

Italics – Denotes sitting Councillor.
Bold – Denotes the winning candidate.

External links
 Liverpool City Council: Ward profile

References

Wards of Liverpool